is a Japanese footballer currently playing as a left-back for Tegevajaro Miyazaki.

Career statistics

Club
.

Notes

References

1994 births
Living people
Association football people from Kagoshima Prefecture
Fukuoka University alumni
Japanese footballers
Association football defenders
Japan Football League players
J3 League players
Tegevajaro Miyazaki players